Hellula is a genus of moths of the family Crambidae. It was described by Achille Guenée in 1854

Species
 Hellula aqualis Barnes & McDunnough, 1914
 Hellula caecigena (Meyrick, 1933)
 Hellula galapagensis Landry & Roque-Albelo, 2008
 Hellula hydralis Guenée, 1854 – cabbage centre grub
 Hellula kempae Munroe, 1972
 Hellula phidilealis (Walker, 1859) – cabbage budworm moth
 Hellula rogatalis (Hulst, 1886)
 Hellula simplicalis Herrich-Schäffer, 1871
 Hellula subbasalis (Dyar, 1923)
 Hellula undalis (Fabricius, 1794) – cabbage webworm, Old World webworm
 Hellula sp. nov. (extinct)

References

Glaphyriini
Crambidae genera
Taxa named by Achille Guenée